Dubrovka (Ermendü) is a rural locality (a settlement) in Mayminskoye Rural Settlement of Mayminsky District, the Altai Republic, Russia. The population was 467 as of 2016. There are 14 streets.

Geography 
Dubrovka is located on the Katun River, 11 km southwest of Mayma (the district's administrative centre) by road. Rybalka is the nearest rural locality.

References 

Rural localities in Mayminsky District